Kim Isaac Eisler is an American writer.  He has been a columnist for Washingtonian Magazine and is the author of several books.

One of his areas of focus has been legal affairs, two of his books being on law firms, while a third is a biography of Supreme Court Justice William J. Brennan Jr.

He is also a fan of race horses, and invented the Eisler Handicapping System.

Bibliography

References

Year of birth missing (living people)
Living people